The 1999–2000 SM-liiga season was the 25th season of the SM-liiga, the top level of ice hockey in Finland. 12 teams participated in the league, and TPS Turku won the championship.

Standings

Playoffs

Quarterfinals
 TPS - Ilves 3:0 (6:3, 7:1, 4:3 P)
 HPK - Blues 3:1 (5:2, 3:4 P, 8:1, 4:1)
 Tappara - HIFK 1:3 (1:3, 2:3 P, 5:3, 4:5)
 Lukko - Jokerit 1:3 (1:0, 2:3 P, 0:1, 1:3)

Semifinals
 TPS - HIFK 3:1 (4:5, 3:1, 6:1, 4:2)
 HPK - Jokerit 0:3 (3:4 P, 0:7, 3:4)

3rd place
 HPK - HIFK 5:2

Final
 TPS - Jokerit 3:1 (4:2, 4:1, 2:3, 2:1)

Qualification

1st round

2nd round

External links
 SM-liiga official website

1999–2000 in Finnish ice hockey
Finnish
Liiga seasons